Geotextiles and Geomembranes is a bimonthly peer-reviewed scientific journal. It is the official journal of the International Geosynthetics Society and published on their behalf by Elsevier. The journal covers all topics relating to geosynthetics, including research, behaviour, performance analysis, testing, design, construction methods, case histories, and field experience.

Abstracting and indexing
The journal is abstracted and indexed in:

According to the Journal Citation Reports, the journal has a 2020 impact factor of 5.292.

See also
Geotechnical engineering

References

External links

Bimonthly journals
Elsevier academic journals
Materials science journals
Publications established in 1984
English-language journals